Felice Mancini (born 10 June 1965) is an Italian former footballer, who played as a midfielder, and a current coach.

He is the father of Andrea Mancini.

Career
Born in Rome, capital of Italy, Mancini started his professional career at Abruzzo club Pescara, where he played a few Serie A and Serie B games during his 6-year contract, He also left the club in temporary deal for various Serie C2 club, for Frosinone (from Lazio region) and Lanciano (Abruzzo region). In November 1990 he finally left the club for Apulia club Martina.

Mancini without a club for a season. In 1992–93 he joined Marche team Civitanovese.

After retirement he became a head coach for amateur team in Abruzzo. In May 2004 he obtained a coaching license as youth team coach. He was appointed as the coach of Notaresco of Eccellenza Abruzzo in October 2007 but the chairman retreated the decision few days later.

In January 2008 he was appointed as the coach of Pescara's Esordienti team (under-13 team). Mancini also led Giovanissimi B team (under-14 team) in the provincial youth league.

Mancini returned to amateur football in July 2008 as the coach of Silvi (Promozione).

Since 2009–10 season he was the coach of Giovanissimi under-15 team.

In May 2012 he obtained Italian II-class coaching license, which equivalent to UEFA A License, made Mancini eligible to coach Lega Pro clubs or as vice-coach of Serie A and Serie B teams. However along with Cristian Bucchi who also freshly obtained their license, were remained in youth coaching for Pescara.

References

External links
 Serie A profile (data by Panini) 

Italian footballers
Italian football managers
Delfino Pescara 1936 players
Frosinone Calcio players
S.S. Virtus Lanciano 1924 players
A.S.D. Martina Calcio 1947 players
Serie A players
Serie B players
Delfino Pescara 1936 managers
Association football midfielders
Footballers from Rome
1965 births
Living people